Humboldtia decurrens is a species of plant in the family Fabaceae.

Location
Humboldtia decurrens is a highly rare endemic tree found only in India in the southern part of the Western Ghats, ranging from the Anamalai Hills to the Travancore range.

Habitat
A common species of low to medium elevation found in evergreen forests.

References

decurrens
Endemic flora of India (region)
Flora of the Western Ghats
Near threatened flora of Asia
Taxonomy articles created by Polbot
Taxa named by Daniel Oliver
Taxa named by Richard Henry Beddome